The 1898 Montana Agricultural football team was an American football team that represented the Agricultural College of the State of Montana (later renamed Montana State University) during the 1898 college football season. In its first and only season under head coach George Ahern, the team compiled a 0–2 record and did not score a point, losing the second and third games of the Montana–Montana State football rivalry.

Schedule

References

Montana Agricultural
Montana State Bobcats football seasons
Montana Agricultural football